Yokohl Ranch, California was a proposed  town in an unincorporated area of Tulare County, California. The J.G. Boswell Company (Yokohl Ranch Company LLC) would have developed the new town in phases over  25 to 30 years if approved, but was eventually foiled.

The Yokohl Ranch Proposal includes: 
A mixed-use Town Center, healthcare facilities, 10,000 homes for 30,000 people, new public schools, fire and police stations, resort lodge, 3 golf courses, a water reclamation plant, reservoir, recreation center, parks, trails, employment center, and approximately 70% of the land remaining undeveloped.

References

External links
Yokohl Ranch.com
Save Yokohl Valley.org
Tulare County Citizens for Responsible Growth » History

Planned communities in California
Proposed populated places in the United States
Tulare County, California
Populated places in the Sierra Nevada (United States)